Group B of the 2004 Fed Cup Europe/Africa Zone Group I was one of four pools in the Europe/Africa Zone Group I of the 2004 Fed Cup. Three teams competed in a round robin competition, with the top two teams advancing to the advancement play-offs and the bottom team being relegated down to the relegation play-offs.

Israel vs. Netherlands

South Africa vs. Ukraine

Israel vs. South Africa

Netherlands vs. Ukraine

Netherlands vs. South Africa

Israel vs. Ukraine

See also
Fed Cup structure

References

External links
 Fed Cup website

2004 Fed Cup Europe/Africa Zone